James Crofts may refer to:
James Scott, 1st Duke of Monmouth (1649–1685), English nobleman, originally called James Crofts
James Crofts (British Army officer)

See also
 James Croft (disambiguation)